The meridian 61° west of Greenwich is a line of longitude that extends from the North Pole across the Arctic Ocean, Greenland, North America, the Atlantic Ocean, South America, the Southern Ocean, and Antarctica to the South Pole.

The 61st meridian west forms a great circle with the 119th meridian east.

From Pole to Pole
Starting at the North Pole and heading south to the South Pole, the 61st meridian west passes through:

{| class="wikitable plainrowheaders"
! scope="col" width="120" | Co-ordinates
! scope="col" width="165" | Country, territory or sea
! scope="col" | Notes
|-
| style="background:#b0e0e6;" | 
! scope="row" style="background:#b0e0e6;" | Arctic Ocean
| style="background:#b0e0e6;" | Passing just east of Ellesmere Island, Nunavut,  (at )
|-
| style="background:#b0e0e6;" | 
! scope="row" style="background:#b0e0e6;" | Lincoln Sea
| style="background:#b0e0e6;" |
|-
| 
! scope="row" | 
|Hall Land
|-
| style="background:#b0e0e6;" | 
! scope="row" style="background:#b0e0e6;" | Baffin Bay
| style="background:#b0e0e6;" |
|-
| style="background:#b0e0e6;" | 
! scope="row" style="background:#b0e0e6;" | Davis Strait
| style="background:#b0e0e6;" | Passing just east of Baffin Island, Nunavut,  (at )
|-
| style="background:#b0e0e6;" | 
! scope="row" style="background:#b0e0e6;" | Atlantic Ocean
| style="background:#b0e0e6;" | Labrador Sea
|-valign="top"
| 
! scope="row" | 
| Newfoundland and Labrador — Labrador Quebec — from 
|-
| style="background:#b0e0e6;" | 
! scope="row" style="background:#b0e0e6;" | Gulf of Saint Lawrence
| style="background:#b0e0e6;" |
|-
| 
! scope="row" | 
| Nova Scotia — Cape Breton Island and Isle Madame
|-
| style="background:#b0e0e6;" | 
! scope="row" style="background:#b0e0e6;" | Chedabucto Bay
| style="background:#b0e0e6;" |
|-
| 
! scope="row" | 
| Nova Scotia
|-valign="top"
| style="background:#b0e0e6;" | 
! scope="row" style="background:#b0e0e6;" | Atlantic Ocean
|-
| 
! scope="row" | 
| Martinique
|-
| style="background:#b0e0e6;" | 
! scope="row" style="background:#b0e0e6;" | Atlantic Ocean
| style="background:#b0e0e6;" | Saint Lucia Channel
|-
| 
! scope="row" | 
|
|-valign="top"
| style="background:#b0e0e6;" | 
! scope="row" style="background:#b0e0e6;" | Atlantic Ocean
| style="background:#b0e0e6;" | Passing just east of the island of St Vincent,  (at ) Passing just east of the island of Baliceaux,  (at ) Passing just east of the island of Mustique,  (at )
|-valign="top"
| 
! scope="row" | 
| Island of Trinidad
|-
| style="background:#b0e0e6;" | 
! scope="row" style="background:#b0e0e6;" | Atlantic Ocean
| style="background:#b0e0e6;" | 
|-valign="top"
| 
! scope="row" | 
| Island of Trinidad
|-
| style="background:#b0e0e6;" | 
! scope="row" style="background:#b0e0e6;" | Atlantic Ocean
| style="background:#b0e0e6;" |
|-
| 
! scope="row" | 
|
|-
| 
! scope="row" | 
| Territory claimed by 
|-
| 
! scope="row" | 
|
|-valign="top"
| 
! scope="row" | 
| Roraima Amazonas — from  Mato Grosso — from  Rondônia — from 
|-
| 
! scope="row" | 
|
|-
| 
! scope="row" | 
|
|-
| 
! scope="row" | 
|
|-
| style="background:#b0e0e6;" | 
! scope="row" style="background:#b0e0e6;" | Atlantic Ocean
| style="background:#b0e0e6;" |
|-
| 
! scope="row" | 
| Weddell Island and West Falkland — claimed by 
|-
| style="background:#b0e0e6;" | 
! scope="row" style="background:#b0e0e6;" | Atlantic Ocean
| style="background:#b0e0e6;" |
|-
| style="background:#b0e0e6;" | 
! scope="row" style="background:#b0e0e6;" | Southern Ocean
| style="background:#b0e0e6;" |
|-valign="top"
| 
! scope="row" | South Shetland Islands
|-
| style="background:#b0e0e6;" | 
! scope="row" style="background:#b0e0e6;" | Southern Ocean
| style="background:#b0e0e6;" | Passing just west of Trinity Island
|-valign="top"
| 
! scope="row" | Antarctica
|-
| style="background:#b0e0e6;" | 
! scope="row" style="background:#b0e0e6;" | Southern Ocean
| style="background:#b0e0e6;" | Weddell Sea
|-valign="top"
| 
! scope="row" | Antarctica
|-
|}

See also
60th meridian west
62nd meridian west

w061 meridian west